The year 1826 in science and technology involved some significant events, listed below.

Astronomy
 Mary Somerville presents a paper on "The Magnetic Properties of the Violet Rays of the Solar Spectrum" to the Royal Society in London.

Chemistry
 Antoine Jerome Balard isolates bromine.
 Pierre Jean Robiquet isolates the dye alizarin.
 Michael Faraday determines the chemical formula of naphthalene.

Exploration
 May 22 –  departs on her first voyage from Plymouth for a hydrographic survey of the Patagonia and Tierra del Fuego regions of South America.
 Hyacinthe de Bougainville completes a three-year global circumnavigation.

Mathematics
 Journal für die reine und angewandte Mathematik is founded by August Leopold Crelle in Berlin.
 February – Nikolai Lobachevsky first presents his system of non-Euclidean hyperbolic geometry.

Physiology and medicine
 Johannes Peter Müller publishes his first important works, Zur vergleichenden Physiologie des Gesichtsinns ("On the comparative physiology of sight", Leipzig) and Über die phantastischen Gesichtserscheinungen ("On visual hallucination", Coblenz), making a first statement of the law of specific nerve energies.

Technology
 January 30 – The Menai Suspension Bridge, built by engineer Thomas Telford, is opened between the island of Anglesey and the mainland of Wales.
 April 1 – American inventor Samuel Morey patents a compressionless internal combustion engine in the United States.
 June – Nicéphore Niépce produces the first photograph, View from the Window at Le Gras.
 Benoit Fourneyron develops an efficient outward-flow water turbine.

Zoology
 Karl Ernst von Baer discovers the mammalian ovum.
 The Austrian zoologist Johann Nepomuk Meyer first describes the Asiatic lion under the name Felis leo persicus.
 The Zoological Society of London is founded by Sir Thomas Stamford Raffles.

Awards
 Copley Medal: James South

Births
 January 15 – Marie Pasteur (died 1910), French chemist.
 May 26 – Richard Carrington (died 1875), English astronomer.
 June 26 – Morgan Crofton (died 1915), Irish mathematician.
 July 7 – John Fowler (died 1864), English agricultural engineer.
 July 13 – Stanislao Cannizzaro (died 1910), Italian chemist.
 August 21 - Karl Gegenbaur (died 1903), German anatomist.
 September 17 – Bernhard Riemann (died 1866), German mathematician.
 October 8 – Emily Blackwell (died 1910), American physician.

Deaths
 January 3 – Marie Le Masson Le Golft (born 1750), French naturalist. 
 January 6 – John Farey (born 1766), English geologist.
 March 28 - Jean-Baptiste Dumangin (born 1744), French physician.
 June 7 – Joseph von Fraunhofer (born 1787), German physicist.
 June 30 - Clément Joseph Tissot (born 1747), French physician and physiotherapist.
 July 4 – Thomas Jefferson (born 1743), Founding Father and 3rd President of the United States and inventor.
 July 22 – Giuseppe Piazzi (born 1746), Italian astronomer.
 August 13 - René Laennec (born 1781), French physician and musician.
 September 6 - Andrea Vaccà Berlinghieri (born 1772), Italian surgeon.
 October 25 – Philippe Pinel (born 1745), French psychiatrist.
 November 23 – Johann Elert Bode (born 1747), German astronomer.
 November 24 - Clarke Abel (born 1780), British surgeon and naturalist.

References

 
19th century in science
1820s in science